The compound of twenty octahedra with rotational freedom is a uniform polyhedron compound. It's composed of a symmetric arrangement of 20 octahedra, considered as triangular antiprisms. It can be constructed by superimposing two copies of the compound of 10 octahedra UC16, and for each resulting pair of octahedra, rotating each octahedron in the pair by an equal and opposite angle θ.

When θ is zero or 60 degrees, the octahedra coincide in pairs yielding (two superimposed copies of) the compounds of ten octahedra UC16 and UC15 respectively. When

 

octahedra (from distinct rotational axes) coincide in sets four, yielding the compound of five octahedra. When

the vertices coincide in pairs, yielding the compound of twenty octahedra (without rotational freedom).

Cartesian coordinates 
Cartesian coordinates for the vertices of this compound are all the cyclic permutations of

 

where τ = (1 + )/2 is the golden ratio (sometimes written φ).

Gallery

References 
.

Polyhedral compounds